Donald William Felder (born September 21, 1947) is an American musician who was the lead guitarist of the rock band Eagles from 1974 until his termination from the band in 2001. He was inducted into the Rock and Roll Hall of Fame in 1998 with the Eagles. Felder was inducted into the Musicians Hall of Fame and Museum in 2016.

Early life 
Don Felder was born in Gainesville, Florida, on September 21, 1947. He was raised in a Southern Baptist family.

Felder was first attracted to music after watching Elvis Presley live on The Ed Sullivan Show. He acquired his first guitar when he was about ten years old, which he has stated he exchanged with a friend at the five-and-dime for a handful of cherry bombs. A self-taught musician, he was heavily influenced by rock and roll. At the age of 13 he started his first band, the Continentals which also included Stephen Stills and Isaac Guillory.

Felder's family could not afford music lessons, but he taught himself to play guitar by ear, by listening to tape recordings that he played back at half speed.  He worked at a music school started by a Berklee graduate, who taught music theory and some notation to Felder during his employment there.

Early bands
Around that time, he met Bernie Leadon who later became one of the founding members of the Eagles. Leadon replaced Stephen Stills in the Continentals, which eventually changed its name to the Maundy Quintet. Felder and Leadon both attended Gainesville High School. Felder gave guitar lessons at a local music shop for about 18 months, at which time Felder also learned how to play slide guitar from Duane Allman. Although Felder claimed that he taught a young Tom Petty how to play the guitar, Petty denied that he was ever taught the guitar by Felder, but did acknowledge that he learned the piano.

The Maundy Quintet recorded and released a 45 rpm single on the Tampa-based Paris Tower label in 1967, which received airplay in north-central Florida.

After the Maundy Quintet broke up, Felder went to Manhattan, New York City, with a band called Flow, which released a self-titled improvisational rock fusion album in 1970. The 1970 Flow album has the distinction of being among the first issued on the newly independent CTI Records label, founded by noted jazz producer Creed Taylor. While in New York, Felder improved his mastery of improvisation on the guitar and learned various styles. After Flow broke up, Felder moved to Boston where he got a job in a recording studio.

In 1973, Felder moved to Los Angeles where he was hired as guitar player for a tour by David Blue, replacing David Lindley who was touring with Crosby & Nash. He helped Blue put together a tour, during which they opened at a few Crosby and Nash shows in November 1973 and for Neil Young at the opening of the Roxy Theatre. Once again, Felder replaced Lindley, this time in Crosby & Nash's band when Lindley fell ill. He would also jam from time to time with the Eagles in their rehearsal space.

In 1974, he featured on the Michael Dinner album The Great Pretender.

Eagles
In early January 1974, Felder was called by the Eagles to add slide guitar to their song "Good Day in Hell" and some guitar solos to "Already Gone". Shortly afterwards, he was invited to join the band. Concurrently, the band began distancing themselves from their initial country rock style and moving more in the direction of full-fledged rock music. On the band's fourth album, One of These Nights, Felder sang lead vocal on the song "Visions" (the only song of which he was lead vocalist), which he co-wrote with Don Henley, and arranged the title track's distinctive guitar solo and bass line.

After founding member Bernie Leadon departed in 1975 following the tour to support the album, Joe Walsh joined the band. Felder had previously jammed with Walsh while Leadon was still a member of the Eagles, and together as dual guitar leads, they would eventually become one of rock music's most memorable onstage partnerships. Felder also doubled on banjo, mandolin and pedal steel guitar on future tours, all of which were previously handled by Leadon.

The first album that the Eagles released after the lineup change was Hotel California, which became a major international bestseller. Felder submitted "16 or 17 tracks" that resulted in the songs "Victim of Love" and the album's title track, "Hotel California". After the release of Hotel California and the tour that followed, the Eagles found themselves under tremendous pressure to repeat this success and tensions were made worse by alcohol, cocaine and other drugs. Bassist Randy Meisner left the band after the tour due to exhaustion and he was replaced by former Poco bassist Timothy B. Schmit, who had also replaced him in that band. Nevertheless, the fighting did not end with the addition of the mild-mannered Schmit, but it rather intensified during the recording of The Long Run, which took 18 months to complete, and Felder and Glenn Frey were especially hostile to one another, despite respecting each other's musical abilities.

According to Henley, Felder attempted to gain more control by co-opting Walsh so frequently that it was the pair up against himself and Frey when the band was dividing into factions and even Henley and Frey began to have their differences, thus causing the Eagles to disband.

At a concert in Long Beach, California, for Senator Alan Cranston on July 31, 1980, known as the "Long Night at Wrong Beach", things hit a breaking point in the band when the animosity between Felder and Frey boiled over before the show began after Felder said, "You're welcome – I guess" to Cranston and his wife, thus offending Frey. He angrily confronted Felder and the pair began to threaten beatings throughout the show. Felder recalls Frey telling him during "Best of My Love", "I'm gonna kick your ass when we get off the stage." After the concert, Felder smashed, according to Frey, Felder's "cheapest guitar". The Eagles disbanded shortly thereafter.

Post-1970s career
Following the 1980 disbandment of the Eagles, Felder focused more on his family, but also embarked on a solo career, concentrating on film composition and session work. He worked on the Bee Gees' 1981 album Living Eyes as a session guitarist. Through his association with Bee Gees' producer Albhy Galuten, Felder made session appearances on albums by artists as diverse as Diana Ross, Barbra Streisand, and Andy Gibb. During this time, he also contributed guitar work to Stevie Nicks' first two solo albums, Bella Donna and The Wild Heart.

In 1983, Felder released his first solo album entitled Airborne. The album's single "Never Surrender", co-written with Kenny Loggins, was a minor hit, having also appeared on the soundtrack to the popular motion picture teen comedy Fast Times at Ridgemont High.

In 1985, Henley offered Felder $5,000 a week (US $ in  dollars) to go on tour with him, but Felder turned it down, citing both dissatisfaction with the pay and a desire to not go on tour.

Among his musical film credits in the 1980s are two songs on the soundtrack to the 1981 animated cult film Heavy Metal entitled "Heavy Metal (Takin' a Ride)" (with former bandmates Don Henley and Timothy B. Schmit contributing backing vocals) and  "All of You" – with Jefferson Starship's Mickey Thomas as backing vocalist, as well as the title track "Wild Life" from the 1985 motion picture adaptation of Neil Simon's The Slugger's Wife.  He also penned the song "She's Got A Part of Me" from the soundtrack to the 1985 romantic comedy Secret Admirer.

Felder's television credits include FTV, a musical comedy show that parodied MTV and music videos which he hosted from 1985 to 1986, and Galaxy High, the 1986 CBS cartoon series for which he scored and performed all of the music, including the series' catchy theme song.

Equipment
Felder is known for his performances using Gibson Les Paul and Gibson EDS-1275 (double-neck 6 and 12 string) electric guitars. This prompted Gibson to name two re-issues after him in 2010, the "Don Felder Hotel California 1959 Les Paul" and the "Don Felder Hotel California EDS-1275". Felder himself is an avid guitar collector, having amassed close to 300 models since childhood.

Felder uses Fender Deluxe Reverb and Tweed Deluxe amplifiers modified by Dumble Amplifiers. When performing Hotel California, the 12-string side of the 1275 plays through a Leslie speaker.

Felder's pedalboard consists of a Voodoo "Pedal Power", a Fulltone "OCD" overdrive, two Boss "Digital Delay DD-3's" delays, a Boss "Chorus Ensemble" chorus, an MXR "Talk box", and a Peterson "Stomp Classic" tuner.

Eagles Band reformation

Sparked by the success of the tribute album Common Thread: The Songs of the Eagles, the band (including Felder) regrouped 14 years later for a concert aired on MTV, which resulted in a new album Hell Freezes Over in 1994. For the live MTV performance, the band's signature song "Hotel California" was rearranged into an acoustic version and Felder kicked off the set by performing it with a new, flamenco-style intro.

Felder performed (with all current and former band members) the hits "Take It Easy" and "Hotel California" at the band's 1998 induction into the Rock and Roll Hall of Fame in Manhattan, New York City. He continued as a member of the Eagles until 2001.

Band termination and lawsuit against the Eagles
On February 6, 2001, Felder was fired from the Eagles. He responded by filing two lawsuits alleging wrongful termination, breach of implied-in-fact contract, and breach of fiduciary duty, reportedly seeking $50 million in damages. Felder alleged that from the 1994 Hell Freezes Over tour onward, Henley and Frey had "insisted that they each receive a higher percentage of the band's profits", whereas the money had previously been split in five equal portions. Felder also accused them of coercing him into signing an agreement under which Henley and Frey would receive three times more of the Selected Works: 1972–1999 proceeds than would Felder. This box set, released in November 2000, has sold approximately 267,000 copies and earned over $16 million. Henley and Frey then countersued Felder for breach of contract, alleging that Felder had written and attempted to sell the rights to a "tell-all" book.

On January 23, 2002, the Los Angeles County Court consolidated the two complaints and on May 8, 2007, the case was settled out of court for an undisclosed amount. Despite the settlement, Felder has since filed subsequent lawsuits against the Eagles.

Heaven and Hell: My Life in The Eagles (1974–2001) was published in the United Kingdom on November 1, 2007. The American edition was published by John Wiley & Sons on April 28, 2008, with Felder embarking on a publicity campaign.

Autobiography
Felder's autobiography Heaven and Hell: My Life in the Eagles (1974–2001) was published in early 2008. The book allowed Felder to tell his life story, describe his relationships with Glenn Frey and Don Henley, and to relate his own version of his termination from the band in 2001. In an interview done on April 27, 2008 with Jim Farber of the New York Daily News, Felder is quoted as saying that he "wasn't out to hang people's heads for the whole community to see, that wasn't the point of the book. The point was to tell my story."

Life after the Eagles
In a 2008 interview with Howard Stern, Felder affirmed that he remains friends with fellow former Eagles members Bernie Leadon and Randy Meisner.  When asked if he still had any contact with Frey or Henley, Felder stated that the only replies he gets are from their respective attorneys.

Nearly three decades after the release of Airborne, his second solo album Road to Forever was released on October 9, 2012, with "Fall from the Grace of Love" as the lead single, a song that featured the harmony vocals of Crosby, Stills & Nash.

When the Eagles did their History of the Eagles Tour, 2013-2015, to coincide with their two-part documentary, it was criticized by Felder for being incomplete. He did not participate in the associated tour.
Since 2005, Felder has been touring with his own band, the Don Felder Band. In 2014, they toured with rock bands Styx and Foreigner.  In 2017, Felder toured the US with Styx and REO Speedwagon.

In 2019, Felder announced that he would release his third studio album, American Rock 'n' Roll, on April 5 on CD and vinyl. The album features musicians such as Sammy Hagar, Slash (who lives near Felder), Richie Sambora, Orianthi, Peter Frampton, Joe Satriani, Mick Fleetwood, Chad Smith, Bob Weir, David Paich, Steve Porcaro, Alex Lifeson and Jim Keltner, among others. Felder will go on a worldwide tour to promote the new album. The title track references artists from Jimi Hendrix and Santana to The Doobie Brothers, Bruce Springsteen, Red Hot Chili Peppers, Van Halen, Guns N’ Roses and more.

In 2016, the day after Frey's death, Felder told the Associated Press that he felt an "unbelievable sorrow" when he learned about Frey's death. "I had always hoped somewhere along the line, he and I would have dinner together, talking about old times and letting it go with a handshake and a hug."

Discography

with Eagles
Studio albums
On the Border (1974)
One of These Nights (1975)
Hotel California (1976)
The Long Run (1979)

Live albums
Eagles Live (1980)
Hell Freezes Over (1994)

Compilation albums
Their Greatest Hits (1971–1975) (1976)
Eagles Greatest Hits, Vol. 2 (1982)
Selected Works: 1972–1999 (2000)
The Very Best Of (2003)
Eagles (2005)

Solo releases
Airborne (1983)
Road to Forever (2012)
American Rock 'n' Roll (2019)

Soundtrack contributions
Heavy Metal: Music from the Motion Picture (1981)
Track 6: "Heavy Metal (Takin' a Ride)" (#43 on the Billboard Hot 100; No. 42 Cash Box)
Track 14: "All of You"
Fast Times at Ridgemont High: Music From the Motion Picture (1982)
Track 10: "Never Surrender" (written by Don Felder and Kenny Loggins)
The Slugger's Wife Soundtrack (1985)
Track 10: "Wild Life"
Secret Admirer Soundtrack (1985)
Track 4: "She's Got A Part of Me"
Nice Dreams Soundtrack (1985)
Track 4: "A Walk in the Garden"

Eagles songs

Eagles songs co-written by Felder 
"Visions" from One of These Nights (Don Felder & Don Henley)
"Too Many Hands" from One of These Nights (Felder & Randy Meisner)
"Victim of Love" from Hotel California (Felder, Henley, Glenn Frey, and J. D. Souther)
"Hotel California" from Hotel California (Felder, Henley, and Frey)
"The Disco Strangler" from The Long Run (Felder, Henley and Frey)
"Those Shoes" from The Long Run (Felder, Henley and Frey)

Eagles song featuring Felder on lead vocal 
"Visions" from One of These Nights

References

Works cited

External links
Don Felder official website
[ Don Felder] at Allmusic

Interview on WNYC Leonard Lopate Show July 17, 2008
Press Release for Heaven and Hell: My Life in the Eagles (1974–2001)
Maclean’s Interview: Don Felder Nov 17, 2008
Reggie Boyle talking with Don Felder

1947 births
Living people
20th-century American musicians
American banjoists
American male guitarists
American male singers
American male songwriters
American mandolinists
American rock guitarists
American session musicians
Eagles (band) members
Gainesville High School (Florida) alumni
Grammy Award winners
Lead guitarists
Musicians from Gainesville, Florida
Musicians from Los Angeles County, California
Pedal steel guitarists
People from Topanga, California
Singers from Florida
Slide guitarists
Writers from Gainesville, Florida
Guitarists from California
Guitarists from Florida
20th-century American guitarists